The CONCACAF Gold Cup is North America's major tournament in senior men's soccer and determines the continental champion. Until 1989, the tournament was known as CONCACAF Championship. It is currently held every two years. From 1996 to 2005, nations from other confederations have regularly joined the tournament as invitees. In earlier editions, the continental championship was held in different countries, but since the inception of the Gold Cup in 1991, the United States are constant hosts or co-hosts. Since then it has expanded to more countries in North America.

From 1973 to 1989, the tournament doubled as the confederation's World Cup qualification. CONCACAF's representative team at the FIFA Confederations Cup was decided by a play-off between the winners of the last two tournament editions in 2015 via the CONCACAF Cup, but was then discontinued along with the Confederations Cup.

Since the inaugural tournament in 1963, the Gold Cup was held 26 times and has been won by seven different nations, most often by Mexico (11 titles).

Canada have entered the tournament for the first time in 1973, and qualified for 16 tournaments since then. Often, they qualified automatically. Once, in 2015, Canada co-hosted the tournament. However, only two Group matches were played in Toronto, and the rest at different venues within the United States.

Canada is one of only four teams to have won the continental championship more than once. They won their first title in 1985, excluding Mexico (Hosts) a year in which the tournament doubled as CONCACAF's qualification phase for the 1986 FIFA World Cup. The second title was won in 2000, when Canada beat invitees Colombia 2–0 in the final in Los Angeles. as well as Mexico and Trinidad and Tobago on route. 

Key to Canada’s success was Carlo Corazzin winning the golden boot and goalkeeper Craig Forrest winning MVP. A rare accolade for a goalkeeper at an international tournament.

Overall record

1985 CONCACAF Championship

The 1985 Championship was played over a seven-month period. The nine teams played in three round-robin groups. The three winners played the final round-robin group in August and September.

Thanks to Canada's away win in Honduras three weeks earlier, Canada was one point ahead in the group table before the final match. This meant the winner would win the tournament and qualify for the 1986 FIFA World Cup. Considering the following 2–1 victory over Honduras came hand-in-hand with Canada's first and only World Cup qualification, it can be considered Canada's greatest success in soccer history. However, they managed to avoid the "big two", Mexico and the United States, because Mexico did not participate as hosts of the 1986 World Cup and the U.S. were eliminated by Costa Rica in the first round.

At the World Cup the following year, Canada was eliminated after three defeats in the Group Stage to France, Hungary and the Soviet Union.

Match overview

2000 CONCACAF Gold Cup

At the 2000 Gold Cup, twelve nations were divided into four groups of three teams, the first two of which would qualify for the knock-out matches. With Colombia, Peru and South Korea, three Non-CONCACAF-members participated as invitees.

After all three matches of Canada's Group D ended as draws, a coin toss was needed to determine whether Canada or South Korea would advance to the knockout stage. Canada won the toss and eventually the tournament, eliminating Mexico on the way and winning the final 2–0 against Colombia.

The title victory allowed Canada to represent CONCACAF at the 2001 Confederations Cup, where they were eliminated in the Group Stage.

Match overview

References

Countries at the CONCACAF Gold Cup
Canada men's national soccer team